Tapal Tea is a Pakistani tea company which is based in Karachi, Pakistan. 

Tapal is the market leader of branded tea in Pakistan. The main competitors of Tapal are Unilever's Lipton and Eastern Tea Company’s Vital. The previous competitor was Brooke Bond’s Supreme until Unilever bought it in 1990.

Products
Cold coffee
Hot coffee
Green tea 
Milk tea
Ice Tea

Current Products 
Chenak
Danedar
Family Mixture
Tezdum
Mezban

History
The company was founded by Adam Ali Tapal in November 1947 as a retail outlet at Jodia Bazaar. He started by importing tea from Ceylon. 

It is the largest tea brand in the country. Their biggest competitor in Pakistan is Lipton Tea. They are also known for their popular commercials.

In 2004, the company expanded their operations in Saudi Arabia. Currently Tapal is exporting Tea to 20 countries.

Management 
The chairman of the company is Aftab Tapal. The board of directors include Mehvish Tapal, Kumail Tapal and Maria Tapal.

Research Lab 
The company carries out research and development activity involving different tea grades at its Tapal Tea Lab.

Tapal Energy Ltd
The Tapal family also have energy investments in the form of a 126 Mega Watt furnace oil powered diesel reciprocating generator in Karachi near Hub and wind and solar operations.

References

1947 establishments in Pakistan
Food and drink companies based in Karachi
Food and drink companies established in 1947
Tea brands in Pakistan
Drink companies of Pakistan
Tea companies
Privately held companies of Pakistan